Nikos Kousidis (born 3 January 1993) is a Greek professional footballer who plays as a winger.

Career
On 26 May 2012, Kousidis signed his first professional contract with Panathinaikos. On 6 January 2014, Kousidis signed a contract with Superleague Greece club Aris.

References

External links
 
Myplayer.gr Profile

1993 births
Living people
Greek expatriate footballers
Panathinaikos F.C. players
Aris Thessaloniki F.C. players
Super League Greece players
Association football wingers
Footballers from Heraklion
Greek footballers